The Battle of Chiset also known as the Battle of Chizai or Battle of Chizé was fought at Chizé on 21 March 1373 between English and French forces during the Hundred Years' War.  The French had laid siege to the town and the English sent a relief force. The French, led by Bertrand du Guesclin, met the relief force and defeated it.

It was the last major battle in the Valois campaign to recover the county of Poitou, which had been ceded to the English by the Treaty of Brétigny in 1360. The French victory put an end to English domination in the area.

References 

 the article is partly based on the equivalent article on French Wikipedia

Chiset
Conflicts in 1373
1373 in England
1370s in France
Hundred Years' War, 1369–1389